Ndana can refer to two islands in Indonesia:
 Pamana Island, off Rote Island, southernmost island of Indonesia
 Dana Island (Sabu Raijua), off Sawu Island